Club Social, Deportivo y Cultural Español de la República Argentina (commonly referred to as Deportivo Español) is an Argentine sports club from the Parque Avellaneda district of Buenos Aires. The club is mostly known for its football team, which currently plays in the Primera C, the fourth division of the Argentine football league system.

Apart from football, other activities practised at the club are futsal, handball, roller hockey, table tennis.

History
The club was founded in 1956 with the name "Club Deportivo Español" on October, 12. The date was chosen as its foundation date to commemorate the arrival of Christopher Columbus to the Americas. Club's first headquarters was in the bar "La Mezquita" of Buenos Aires, and after two years of being founded Deportivo Español had about 2,000 members, mostly of them were Spanish descendant living in Argentina.

In 1957 Español affiliated to the Argentine Football Association and the football team began to participate in the fourth division ("Tercera de Ascenso", now Primera D). Since then, the team ascended the tiers in Argentine football: in 1958 (a year after joining the AFA) Español won the championship promoting to "Segunda de Ascenso" (now Primera C. Only 3 years after promoting to the upper category, Español won another title promoting to the second division of Argentine football, Primera B Metropolitana. The squad went on a tour that same year, playing some matches in Spain against teams such as Real Madrid.

In 1967, ten years after its foundation, Español promoted to the Argentine Primera División, the top category of Argentine football. The club not only developed a competitive football squad but also became the most popular Spanish club in Argentina. During those years the Municipality of Buenos Aires gave the club 16 hectares located in the district known as "Bajo Flores", in the south of the city. In those lands Español began to build its sports installations with the help of the members themselves, who worked hard collaborating side-by-side with the club.

During the following years, Español would be successively relegated until the Primera C in 1972, returning to the upper division when the team proclaimed champion in 1979. In 1984 Español promoted to the first division, where the team made its best performance at the top level of Argentine football in the 1985–86 season. Español finished 2nd along with Newell's Old Boys, defeating Independiente, San Lorenzo de Almagro, former champion River Plate in the Estadio Monumental and remained unbeaten against Boca Juniors. In the next seasons, Español finished 3rd in 1988–89 season and 2nd in the 1992 Clausura.

After 14 years in Primera División, Español was relegated to Primera B Nacional at the end of the 1997/98 season, and then to the lower categories. The team currently plays in the third division of Argentine football, the Primera B Metropolitana.

Players

Current squad
.

Titles

Primera B (1): 1984, 2001–02
Primera C (2): 1960, 1979
Primera D (1): 1958

References

External links

 

 
Association football clubs established in 1956
1956 establishments in Argentina
Football clubs in Buenos Aires